The Wigan Junction Railways connected Glazebrook West Junction with the Lancashire Coalfields at Wigan.

History
The Wigan Junction Railways (WJR) was incorporated on 16 July 1874. Promoted by local businessmen, it came to the interest of the board of the Manchester, Sheffield and Lincolnshire Railway (MSLR) which suggested that it might become an extension of the CLC, in which the MSLR had a one-third share. However, of the MSLR's other two joint partners in the CLC, the Midland Railway (MR) were in favour, whereas the Great Northern Railway (GNR) were not. Accordingly, the MSLR and MR decided that its construction should be supported by both companies, and later on be formally added to the Sheffield and Midland Railway Companies' Committee (SMRCC), a body which was owned jointly by the MSLR and MR only.

Construction began on 27 October 1876, the first sod being cut by the Home Secretary, the Rt. Hon. R.A. Cross, who was also MP for South West Lancashire. The line was opened between Glazebrook and Strangeways for goods on 16 October 1879, and was extended to Wigan on 1 April 1884; passenger services also began on 1 April 1884. The trains were provided by the MSLR. Wigan Central railway station was opened on 3 October 1892.

A branch to St Helens was built from Lowton St. Marys: the Liverpool, St Helens and South Lancashire Railway (LSHSL); it opened on 2 January 1900.

The CLC constructed a curve from their line at Dam Lane Junction to the WJR line at Glazebrook Moss Junction; known as Glazebrook West Curve.  in length, it was authorised on 25 May 1900 and opened on 1 July 1900, creating a triangular junction at Glazebrook; by this means, trains from Wigan (and also St. Helens) could run to Warrington and Liverpool Central.

On 4 August 1905 the GCR was authorised to absorb both the WJR and the LSHSL, which was formally carried out on 1 January 1906.

Route

Wigan Central
Lower Ince
Hindley South
Bickershaw and Abram
West Leigh and Bedford
Lowton St Mary's
Culcheth
Newchurch Halt

There were two expresses: the 10:40 from Manchester reached Wigan at 11:15, calling only at Glazebrook; and the 12:00 from Wigan, which ran non-stop to Manchester in half an hour. The Sunday service was of just two trains in each direction, calling at Urmston, Flixton, Irlam and all stations between Glazebrook and Wigan.

In the 1970s, part of the trackbed was converted to Culcheth Linear Park.

Future
In 2009 ATOC identified the south part of the line connecting Glazebrook with the Chat Moss line as a feasible link line for freight use.

Notes

References

Closed railway lines in North West England
Rail transport in Greater Manchester
Rail transport in Cheshire
Great Central Railway